The 1964 American Football League season was the fifth regular season of the AFL.

The season ended when the Buffalo Bills defeated the San Diego Chargers in the AFL Championship game.

This was the final season of AFL telecasts on ABC before the games moved to NBC for the following season.

Division races
The AFL had 8 teams, grouped into two divisions.  Each team would play a home-and-away game against the other 7 teams in the league for a total of 14 games, and the best team in the Eastern Division would play against the best in the Western Division in a championship game.  If there was a tie in the standings at the top of either division, a one-game playoff would be held to determine the division winner.

The Buffalo Bills won their first nine games, before Boston beat them at home on November 15, 36–28.  Buffalo came back from a 24–14 deficit at San Diego on Thanksgiving Day to eke out a 27–24 win.  On December 6 at Oakland, the Raiders beat the Bills on the final play of the game, 16–13, and did not try for an extra point.  Boston won at Kansas City, 31–24, to take Buffalo's lead away.  In Week Fourteen, Boston was idle, and Buffalo took a 1/2 game lead with a 30–19 win at Denver.  As it turned out, the Eastern Division title would come down to the final game of the season, with Buffalo (11–2–0) traveling to Boston (10–2–1) on December 20, with the winner to take all. Jack Kemp led the Bills to three touchdowns for a 24–14 win to capture the title.

The Western Division race was less dramatic.  In Week Six, the Chargers took a lead over the Chiefs during a six-game winning streak, and held that lead for the rest of the season.

Regular season

Results

Standings

Playoffs

Stadium changes
 The New York Jets moved from the Polo Grounds to Shea Stadium

Coaching changes

Offseason
Houston Oilers: Pop Ivy was fired and replaced by Sammy Baugh.

In-season
Denver Broncos: Jack Faulkner was fired after four games. Mac Speedie was named as replacement.

References

External links
Football Database

 
American Football League seasons